The 2006 PGA Argentina Tour was a season of golf tournaments on the PGA of Argentina Tour, the official professional golf tour of Argentina. The season ran from the end of January to the beginning of December, and consisted of nineteen tournaments.

Disputes within the PGA of Argentina escalated during the year, leading eventually to the formation of the TPG Tour in 2007. As a result, the 2006 season was the last time the tour ran a full series of events that included all the major opens in Argentina.

The Order of Merit was won by Andrés Romero, ahead of Rafael Echenique in second, and Ángel Cabrera in third.

Five events were co-sanctioned by the Tour de las Americas, the highest level tour in Latin America, with the Argentine Open also being co-sanctioned by the Challenge Tour.

Schedule of tournaments

External links
http://www.pgargentina.org.ar – official site

Golf in Argentina
Argentina